Igwe Kenneth Onyeneke Orizu III (born 30 October 1925) is the 20th Obi of Otolo and Igwe of Nnewi kingdom. He is the traditional supreme ruler and spiritual leader in Nnewi, an Igbo city in Nigeria. He is a member of the Nnofo Royal lineage and the successor to his father Igwe Josiah Orizu II, his grandfather Igwe Orizu I, and great-grandfather Igwe Iwuchukwu Ezeifekaibeya. Unlike most Igbo chiefs, there were heads of Nnewi before the arrival of Europeans. In Anambra State, Igwe Kenneth Orizu III is the vice chairman of the Anambra State House of Chiefs and  one of the longest-serving tribal chiefs in the world.

Education and career 

Igwe Kenneth was educated at Hope Waddell College, Calabar and completed his education at New Bethel College, Onitsha in 1942. Before his enthronement, Kenneth worked as a Representative of the then Eastern Nigerian Outlook Group of newspapers, in the defunct Eastern Region of Nigeria and later moved to Asaba as the Commercial Manager for Mid-Western Region.. He was also a businessman in Kano.

Reign 

Igwe Orizu III was instrumental in the clearing of the Agbo Edo forest. 
His Uncle, Prince Nwafor Orizu was Nigeria's first republic senate President and his grandfather, Igwe Orizu I (Eze Ugbonyamba) was the first Igbo man to own and drive a car in the entire Eastern Region.
The Ofala Nnewi is a cultural festival held every year to celebrate the coronation of the Igwe of Nnewi.

Cultural transformation 

The Chief is the first of Nigerian Chiefs to abolish the Osu caste system, thus making everyone in the province of Nnewi free born. Kenneth also discouraged wastage of resources at traditional marriage and funeral ceremonies.

Social advocacy 

The Chief dealt with a political crisis in Nnewi by allowing the town in a general assembly to choose a title for him to restore peace in the town. Thereafter, the community named him the GENERAL OF PEACE. His other title is, Commander of the Order of the Niger (CON). The Chief is a one Star Paul Harris Fellow of Rotary International.

Education sector 

The Chief was instrumental in the establishment of a Teachers Training College in Nnewi; now Nnamdi Azikiwe University, Nnewi. He also advocated the siting of the College of Health Sciences of the University by encouraging Nnewi people to make significant financial contributions. He personally donated most of the land for the establishment of the school.

Business 
The Chief facilitated the establishment of New Nnewi market and this market gave Nnewi prominence as one of the largest commercial cities in Nigeria.

References

External links
Official Nnewi Website
Guardianewsngr.com
Thenigerianvoice.com
Thenationonlineng.net
allafrica.com

Igbo monarchs
Nnewi monarchs
Nigerian traditional rulers
People from Nnewi
1925 births
Living people